Mohammad Hashim Kamali (born 7 February 1944) is an Afghan Islamic scholar and former professor of law at the International Islamic University of Malaysia. He taught Islamic law and jurisprudence between 1985 and 2004. One author has described him as "the most widely read living author on Islamic law in the English language."

Education
Kamali studied his BA at University of Kabul and completed his LLM. in comparative law from The London School of Economics and Political Science, and a PhD in Islamic and Middle Eastern law at the University of London, 1969–1976.

Academic career
Kamali served as Professor of Islamic law and jurisprudence at the International Islamic University Malaysia, and also as Dean of the International Institute of Islamic Thought & Civilisation (ISTAC) from 1985 to 2007. He currently is the chairman of the Institute for Law and Society (ILSAF).

Publications
 Freedom of Expression in Islam (1994)
 Principles of Islamic Jurisprudence (Reprint, Petaling Jaya, 1999)
 Islamic Commercial Law (Cambridge: Islamic Texts Society, 2000)
 A Textbook of Hadith Studies (Islamic Foundation, UK, 2005)
 An Introduction to Shari’ah (Oneworld Publications, Oxford 2008)
 Shari'ah Law: An Introduction (Viva Books 2009)
 “Constitutionalism in Islamic Countries: A Contemporary Perspective of Islamic Law,” in: Constitutionalism in Islamic Countries: Between Upheaval and Continuity (eds. Rainer Grote and Tilmann Röder, Oxford University Press, Oxford/New York 2011)
 Moderation and balance in Islam: The Qurʼānic Principle of Wasatiyyah (Oxford University Press, Oxford/New York, 2010)
 The Middle Path of Moderation in Islam: The Qurʼānic Principle of Wasatiyyah (Oxford University Press, Oxford/New York, 2015)

References

Alumni of SOAS University of London
Islamic studies scholars
Legal scholars
Living people
Malaysian people of Malay descent
Malaysian Muslims
1944 births
Academic staff of the International Islamic University Malaysia
Muslim scholars of Islamic jurisprudence
Muslim scholars of Islamic studies